Osiny  is a village in the administrative district of Gmina Gorzyce, within Wodzisław County, Silesian Voivodeship, in southern Poland, close to the Czech border.

References

Villages in Wodzisław County